"Whataya Want from Me" is a song by American recording artist and American Idol eighth season runner-up Adam Lambert from his debut studio album, For Your Entertainment. It was released as the second single from the album. The song peaked at number ten on the Billboard Hot 100, becoming his highest charting single. The song was well received by music critics and charted within the top 10 of the charts in thirteen countries.

The pop rock song was written by Pink, Max Martin, and Shellback and was recorded by Pink for her fifth studio album, Funhouse, but did not make it to the final cut. Lambert's vocal performance of the song received a Grammy nomination for Best Male Pop Vocal Performance.

The song was included on the set list of Lambert's first concert tour, the 2010 Glam Nation Tour where he performed an acoustic rendition of it during the "ballad" section of the show. The song is also featured as one of the numbers in the 2019 jukebox musical & Juliet.

Background
The track was originally recorded and co-written by Pink for the album Funhouse but did not make the final cut. On November 18, 2009, Lambert announced via his official website that his second single from his debut album would be "Whataya Want from Me". The song was the second single announced before the CD was officially available to the public. The song became available as a legal download in the United States on November 20, 2009, when the album was officially released.

In 2010, Pink's recording appeared exclusively on the German and Australian releases of her first greatest hits compilation album, Greatest Hits... So Far!!!.

Critical reception
"Whataya Want from Me" has received generally favorable reviews. Jonathan Keefe from Slant Magazine praised the song and called it "phenomenally well-crafted pop single(s) that give Lambert the opportunity to shine". In the Houston Chronicle, Joey Guerra wrote that the song "...[is] probably the disc's most straightforward cut, with a bit of a Backstreet Boys vibe. Not bad". Huffington Post noted that this song deploys "some tired pop cliches" in the chorus but continued praising "one of the album's more poignant emotional statements, anticipating the heavy burden of expectations the singer is likely to carry while expressing vulnerable appreciation for the acceptance he has received." AllMusic called this song "terrific pop tune" and "P!nk's pained [song]". Entertainment Weekly was also positive by calling it "hooky, heartfelt lament". Detroit News wrote "Credit Team Lambert for pairing him with a host of top-notch, like-minded collaborators" including Pink. LA Times praised that singing is "pleading and soulful." On the other hand, Greg Kot of the Chicago Tribune disliked the song and wrote "Lambert throws his hands up in the whiny 'Whataya Want from Me', a trifle from the team of Pink and Britney Spears svengali Martin." This song took 22nd place on "Top 100 'American Idol' Hits of All Time" by Billboard.

Chart performance
"Whataya Want from Me" debuted at number 72 on the U.S. Billboard Hot 100 on the week of January 2, 2010. Following his appearance as a mentor on American Idol (season 9), the song reached number ten, becoming Lambert's second Top 20 single (the first being his cover of "Mad World", which peaked at number nineteen) and first Top 10 single on the Billboard Hot 100. As of January 2014, the single had sold approximately 2,006,000 copies within the US.

The song is the only Adam Lambert song to appear in the Billboard Year-end, ranking at number forty-five in 2010.

Promotion
To promote the album's release, several songs from the album were performed live on AOL Sessions – including "Whataya Want from Me".  Following Lambert's American Music Awards of 2009 performance of "For Your Entertainment", Lambert was dropped from a few upcoming performances and shows, including Good Morning America and Jimmy Kimmel Live!  Lambert started a very long string of interviews and performances to address the controversy and promote his new single.

"Whataya Want from Me" made its live debut on CBS's The Early Show on November 25, 2009.  He performed two songs, and did a live interview discussing his performance at the American Music Awards that caused much controversy.  In addition to "Whataya Want from Me", he performed "Music Again". His appearance on the morning show drew fans from all over the world to come watch him live.

Lambert performed "Whataya Want from Me" on Late Show with David Letterman on November 25, 2009.

Lambert was interviewed and performed on The Ellen DeGeneres Show on December 1, 2009.

After much controversy with ABC canceling several of Lambert's performances (and due to accusations of homophobia on the behalf of the network), the network finally decided to let Lambert interview and perform on The View.  As a precaution, they pre-taped the interview and performance, to prevent any mishaps or improvisation with Lambert's performance, and to avoid a repeat of his AMA performance.  He performed on December 10, 2009.  The night before he was on Barbara Walters 10 Most Fascinating People of 2009, also on ABC.

Lambert performed on The Tonight Show with Conan O'Brien on December 14, 2009.

Lambert returned to his Fox roots with a live performance of his new single on the season finale of So You Think You Can Dance on December 16, 2009.  He performed on the show with other performers including Jennifer Lopez, and Mary J. Blige. MTV called his performance "show-stopping".

Lambert performed on The Jay Leno Show on December 21, 2009. Adam also cleared up some rumors that were spread around over the past month.

Lambert performed and interviewed on The Oprah Winfrey Show on January 20, 2010.  It was his first performance of 2010, during which he discussed the controversy surrounding his AMA performance, his life since his rapid rise to fame, and his brief meeting with Madonna.

Lambert performed it on the Australian morning program Sunrise.  The interview can be viewed on the show's website. The single has peaked within the top ten in Australia.

In March 2010, Lambert performed on VH1's "Unplugged", where he sang a stripped-down performance of this and other songs off his album.

In April 2010, Lambert performed the song on American Idol, having acted as mentor to the Season 9 contestants during the "Elvis Theme Week".

During April and May 2010, Lambert promoted the single internationally, performing on Finland's X Factor, in Sweden, in the Netherlands, in Germany,  in the UK on the GMTV morning show,  and in Switzerland.

Music video
The music video for "Whataya Want from Me" was directed by Diane Martel and shot on December 20, 2009. It premiered on January 15, 2010, on VH1. The video features Lambert becoming frustrated with his partner, which the audience cannot see (Some of the times, the camera/screen is being the eyes of his partner). There are also performance clips throughout the video of Lambert performing with his band. One scene features Lambert making his way through a crowd of paparazzi and fans into a car. At the beginning of the song, Lambert switches the TV off, and then begins singing "slow it down, whataya want from me," leading one interpretation to be that what he was watching was actually the AMAs.

Lambert himself explains in several interviews that this song is something that everyone can relate to: going through the stresses of a changing personal environment and its effects on a relationship. It is also a reflection of both his own personal life as a rock star as well as his relationship with his audience and fans. He can be seen having an argument throughout the video with the camera, presumably representing his significant other. In one scene, he walks away saying he has had it and his significant other packs their bags and leaves a frustrated Lambert alone and miserable. At the end of the video, he is shown very happily greeting the camera after waking up, hinting at a reconciliation. He also goes to explain in an interview with Pop Couture that the feel was intended to be more "accessible," unlike his "For Your Entertainment" video. This resulted in softer textures and less architectural styling, with the use of cotton and sweaters and the like.

Track listings

CD single No. 1
 "Whataya Want from Me" (Album Version) – 3:47
 "Whataya Want from Me" (Jason Nevins Electrotek Extended Mix) – 6:22

CD single No. 2
 "Whataya Want from Me" (Album Version) – 3:47
 "Whataya Want from Me" (Fonzerelli's New Romantic Club Mix) – 5:52

Australian digital download
 "Whataya Want from Me" – 3:47
 "Whataya Want from Me" (Fonzerelli's Electro House Club Remix) – 5:52

Remixes (Part of Remixes album)
 "Whataya Want from Me" (Brad Walsh's A-Vivir Mix) – 4:31
 "Whataya Want from Me" (Fonzerelli's Electro House Club Remix) – 5:52
 "Whataya Want from Me" (Jason Nevins Electrotek Extended Mix) – 6:22

Credits and personnel
Recording
Recorded at Maratone Studios, Stockholm, Sweden, House of Blues Studios, Los Angeles, California, and Germano Studios, New York City.
Mixed at MixStar Studios, Virginia Beach, Virginia

Personnel
Songwriting – Pink, Max Martin, Shellback
Production – Max Martin, Shellback
Keyboards – Max Martin
Drums, guitar and bass – Shellback
Recording – Max Martin, Shellback, Al Clay, Ann Mincieli
Recording assistant – Chris Galland, Doug Tyo, Christian Baker
Mixing – Serban Ghenea
Mix engineer – John Hanes
Mixing assistant – Tim Roberts

Charts and certifications

Weekly charts

Year-end charts

Certifications

Radio and release history

References

External links
Adam Lambert official site
"Whataya Want from Me" music video

2000s ballads
2009 singles
Adam Lambert songs
Number-one singles in Poland
Music videos directed by Diane Martel
Songs written by Pink (singer)
Songs written by Max Martin
Songs written by Shellback (record producer)
Song recordings produced by Max Martin
Pop ballads
Rock ballads
Song recordings produced by Shellback (record producer)
2009 songs
Pink (singer) songs
RCA Records singles
19 Recordings singles